Christopher Scott Kyle (April 8, 1974 – February 2, 2013) was a United States Navy SEAL sniper. He served four tours in the Iraq War and was awarded several commendations for acts of heroism and meritorious service in combat. He has 160 confirmed kills and was awarded the Silver Star, three Bronze Star Medals with "V" devices for valor, a Navy and Marine Corps Achievement Medal with "V" device, as well as numerous other unit and personal awards.

Kyle was honorably discharged from the U.S. Navy in 2009, and published his bestselling autobiography, American Sniper, in 2012. An eponymous film adaptation of Kyle's book, directed by Clint Eastwood, and starring Bradley Cooper as Kyle, was released two years later. In 2013, Kyle was murdered by Eddie Ray Routh at the Rough Creek Lodge shooting range near Chalk Mountain, Texas. Routh, a former Marine with post-traumatic stress disorder (PTSD), was found guilty and sentenced to life in prison with no possibility of parole.

Early life and education
Christopher Scott Kyle was born on April 8, 1974, in Odessa, Texas, the eldest of two boys born to Deborah Lynn (née Mercer) and Wayne Kenneth Kyle, a Sunday school teacher and deacon. His father bought Kyle his first rifle at the age of eight, a bolt-action .30-06 Springfield rifle, and later a shotgun, with which they hunted deer, pheasant, and quail. Kyle and his brother grew up raising up to 150 head of cattle at a time. Kyle attended high school in Midlothian, Texas, and after graduating in 1992, became a professional bronco rider and ranch hand, however his professional rodeo career ended abruptly when he severely injured his arm. He attended Tarleton State University for two years (1992–94), studying Ranch and Range Management.

Military career

Kyle went to a military recruiting office, as he was interested in joining the U.S. Marine Corps special operations. A U.S. Navy recruiter convinced him to try instead for the SEALs. He enlisted in the United States Navy on August 5, 1998, and began basic training on February 10, 1999. He graduated from basic training at Naval Station Great Lakes, Illinois, in April 1999. He attended additional training as an Intelligence Specialist at NMITC Dam Neck, Virginia, from April to July 1999, and at NPC Millington, Tennessee, from August 1999 to March 2000. Initially, Kyle was rejected because of the pins in his arm, but he eventually received an invitation to the 24-week Basic Underwater Demolition/Sea, Air, Land (SEAL) training (BUD/S) at NAB Coronado, California. Kyle graduated with Class 233 in March 2001, followed by SEAL Qualification Training (SQT) at NAB Coronado from May to August 2001.

Assigned to SEAL Team-3, sniper element, Platoon "Charlie" (later "Cadillac"), within the Naval Special Warfare Command, and with four tours of duty, Kyle served in many major battles of the Iraq War. His first long-range kill shot was taken during the initial invasion when he shot a woman carrying a hand grenade approaching a group of Marines. CNN reported the woman was cradling a toddler in her other hand. As ordered, Kyle opened fire, killing the woman before she could attack.

Military sniper
Kyle was arguably one of the United States military's deadliest snipers in Iraq, with a large number of confirmed and unconfirmed kills. Kyle's shooter's statements (which are filled out by every sniper after a mission) were reported to higher command, who kept them in case any shootings were contested as outside the rules of engagement. The publisher HarperCollins states: "The Pentagon has officially confirmed more than 150 of Kyle's kills (the previous American record was 109), but it has declined to verify the total number for this book." In his autobiography, Kyle wrote:

On July 8, 2016, the U.S. Navy corrected Kyle's DD Form 214 regarding some decorations listed on his original discharge document. The original discharge papers issued to him upon leaving the service tally with the account given in his autobiography: two Silver Stars and five Bronze Stars with valor. The Navy revised it to one Silver Star and four Bronze Stars with valor. The Navy said "Kyle would have played no role in the production of his personnel files other than signing the DD-214 upon his discharge" and "[a]fter thoroughly reviewing all available records, the Navy determined an error was made" and "issued a corrected copy of the DD-214".

Weapons
As a sniper, Kyle was often asked about his weapons. While in training, he used four different rifles in order to know which weapon was the most useful in the given situation. In the field, he used the following:
 a semi-automatic 7.62 NATO Mk 11 sniper rifle (patrol),
 a 5.56 NATO Mk 12 Designated Marksman Rifle modified with the lower receiver of an M4A1 to get a collapsible stock and allow full-auto fire (urban patrol),
 a Remington 700/300, Later type classified as a MK13 Mod 1, .300 Winchester Magnum sniper rifle with McMillan stock and customized barrel, which was later replaced with a .300 Winchester Magnum Accuracy International,
 Various rifles chambered in .338 Lapua Magnum used for long-range shooting.

Post-military life

Kyle left the U.S. Navy in 2009, and moved to Midlothian, Texas, with his wife, Taya, and two children. He was president of Craft International, a tactical training company for the U.S. military and law enforcement communities.

In 2012, HarperCollins released Kyle's autobiography, American Sniper. Kyle had initially hesitated to write the book but was persuaded to move forward because other books about SEALs were under way. In his book, Kyle wrote bluntly of his experiences. Of the battle for control of Ramadi, he says: "Force moved that battle. We killed the bad guys and brought the leaders to the peace table. That is how the world works." In the book and ensuing interviews, Kyle stated he had no regrets about his work as a sharpshooter, saying, "I had to do it to protect the Marines."

American Sniper had a 37-week run on The New York Times bestseller list and brought Kyle national attention. Following its release, media articles challenged some of Kyle's anecdotes, but the core of his narrative was widely accepted. "Tales of his heroism on the battlefield were already lore in every branch of the armed forces", writes Michael J. Mooney, author of a biography of Kyle.

Kyle paired with FITCO Cares Foundation, a nonprofit organization which created the Heroes Project to provide free in-home fitness equipment, individualized programs, personal training, and life-coaching to in-need veterans with disabilities, Gold Star families, or those with PTSD. On August 13, 2012, Kyle appeared on the reality television show Stars Earn Stripes, which featured celebrities pairing up with a Special Operations or law enforcement professional who train them in weapons and combat tactics. Kyle was teamed with actor Dean Cain.

Jesse Ventura defamation lawsuit
In his book American Sniper, Kyle wrote a subchapter titled "Punching Out Scruff Face" about an alleged altercation in a bar. In the book, he claims he punched a man he refers to as "Scruff Face" for allegedly saying "You deserve to lose a few [guys]" and being critical of the Iraq war. According to Kyle, the encounter took place at McP's, a bar in Coronado, California, on October 12, 2006, during a wake for Kyle's comrade, Michael A. Monsoor, a U.S. Navy SEAL who had been killed in Iraq. Petty Officer Monsoor was posthumously awarded the Medal of Honor, on April 8, 2008, for his actions in support of Operation Iraqi Freedom on September 29, 2006. On January 4, 2012, Kyle appeared on Opie and Anthony to discuss his book. On the show, Kyle alleged the character "Scruff" in his book is former Governor of Minnesota Jesse Ventura.

Following the allegations, Ventura denied the incident had happened or having ever met Kyle. Ventura filed a lawsuit in January 2012 against Kyle for charges of defamation, appropriation, and unjust enrichment. After Kyle was killed the following year, the lawsuit was transferred to Kyle's estate. On July 29, 2014, the jury returned a recommendation of 8 to 2 that Kyle was liable to Ventura for defamation and unjust enrichment, but not appropriation. The jury concluded that the Kyle estate owed Ventura $500,000 for defamation, and $1.34 million for unjust enrichment. The district judge, who rendered the final judgment, said that there was "substantial evidence" that supported the jury verdict.

Kyle's widow appealed the verdict on behalf of Kyle's estate. Attorneys for Kyle's estate asked the appeals court to throw out the verdict or at least order a new trial because a lawyer for Ventura told jurors that the $1.8 million judgment would be paid for by Kyle's book publisher's insurance policy, not his estate. In June 2016, the U.S. Court of Appeals for the 8th Circuit threw out the $1.8 million in part due to the revelation of the insurance policy by Ventura's attorneys to the jury. The $1.35 million in "unjust enrichment" was overturned and dismissed as being inconsistent with Minnesota law. The $500k defamation suit was remanded back to trial. In December 2017, the case was settled out of court for an undisclosed amount.

Fabrications of personal narrative
Apart from the story of his attack on Jesse Ventura, Kyle stated his involvement in a number of incidents which were unverifiable, and which some sources have called into question, describing them as unlikely.

Kyle stated that during Hurricane Katrina, after hearing about the civilian strife in the area, he and another man drove to New Orleans to stop "looters." With sniper rifles, they allegedly travelled to New Orleans and then positioned themselves at a vantage point on top of the city's Mercedes-Benz Superdome. There Kyle claimed they started shooting a number of armed residents or looters, whom they identified as making trouble. Some reports stated that Kyle shot 30 with the other sniper, and others saying he shot 30 by himself. This was never verified, and there was no evidence of dozens of people being slain by a sniper or gunman, with commentators noting that it would be unlikely that 30 people would have been murdered without anyone noticing it or reporting it to the media or the police. Kyle's story had been reported in a number of publications, including the New Yorker, with Kyle relating the story to other military personnel.

Kyle also related a story of how he was robbed at a gas station in January 2009, southwest of Dallas. During the robbery, Kyle told the two men he would return to his car to give them his keys. He picked up a gun and shot both robbers dead. However, there is no evidence the incident occurred. There were never any police reports or mention of the incident, and police contacted by journalists were completely unaware of the incident. The incident did not appear in the media, and a journalist visited all the service stations that could match the description, and none of them were aware of it happening. The medical examiners office had no records of anyone being killed in the area at the time. Kyle claimed there was security footage, and that when police officers approached him about the killings, he redirected them to the government, and so Kyle was never charged.

In 2016, the Navy clarified the number of medals Kyle was awarded during his military service. Kyle had claimed in his book that he was awarded two Silver Stars and five Bronze Stars. "Those numbers differed slightly from the Navy personnel form given to Kyle when he left the Navy in 2009. The form said he received two Silver Star and six Bronze Star medals with "V" devices." At that time, the Navy also noted that this form given to Kyle on his retirement was not accurate, and he had actually been awarded one Silver Star and four Bronze Star medals with "V" devices for valor.

Kyle has also claimed a higher number of sniper kills in his service than the Navy has officially attributed to him. While Kyle claims to have killed roughly 320 enemies as part of his service in Iraq, the Navy says he killed 160. The Navy's numbers would be of "confirmed kills" which are only the kills that are able to be confirmed on the battlefield. Kyle stated that the Navy's numbers varied from time to time.

Murder

On February 2, 2013, Kyle and his friend, Chad Littlefield, 35, were shot and killed by Eddie Ray Routh at the Rough Creek Ranch-Lodge-Resort shooting range in Erath County, Texas. Both Kyle and Littlefield were armed with .45-caliber 1911-style pistols when they were killed, but neither gun had been unholstered or fired, and the safety catches were still on. Kyle was killed with a .45-caliber pistol, while Littlefield was shot with a 9 mm SIG Sauer pistol. Both guns belonged to Kyle.

Routh was a 25-year-old U.S. Marine Corps veteran from Lancaster, Texas. Kyle and Littlefield had taken Routh to the gun range in an effort to help him with his post-traumatic stress disorder (PTSD). Routh had been in and out of mental hospitals for at least two years and had been diagnosed with schizophrenia. His family also said he had PTSD from his time in the military. On the way to the shooting range, Kyle texted Littlefield, "This dude is straight-up nuts." Littlefield responded, "Watch my six", military slang meaning "watch my back". Four months later, while he was in his jail cell, Routh shared with former Erath County Sheriff's Deputy Gene Cole: "I was just riding in the back seat of the truck, and nobody would talk to me. They were just taking me to the range, so I shot them. I feel bad about it, but they wouldn't talk to me. I'm sure they've forgiven me."

After the killings, Routh went to his sister's house in Midlothian and told her what he had done. His sister, Laura Blevins, called 9-1-1 and told the emergency operator: "They went out to a shooting range ... Like, he's all crazy. He's ... psychotic." Local police captured Routh after a short freeway chase, which ended when Routh, who fled the scene in Kyle's Ford F-350 truck, crashed into a police cruiser in Lancaster.

Routh was arraigned later that same day on two counts of capital murder, and was taken to the Erath County Jail for holding under a $3 million bond. His trial was set to begin May 5, 2014, but was delayed to allow more time to comply with DNA testing requirements. The trial began on February 11, 2015. On February 24, 2015, Routh was found guilty of killing Kyle and Littlefield. The jury returned the verdict after less than three hours of deliberations. Since prosecutors decided beforehand not to seek the death penalty, the trial judge, Jason Cashon, immediately sentenced Routh to life in prison with no possibility of parole. Routh is imprisoned at the Texas Department of Criminal Justice Ramsey Unit in Rosharon, Texas.

Hundreds of people, many waving American flags, lined Interstate 35 to view the passing procession and to pay their final respects to Kyle.

Legacy

In August 2013, Texas governor Rick Perry signed Senate Bill 162, also known as the "Chris Kyle Bill", to recognize military training in the issuance of occupational licenses. The bill had been co-sponsored by Republican Representative Dan Flynn of Van and Democratic Senator Leticia Van de Putte of San Antonio. The ceremony was attended by Kyle's widow Taya.

Sculptor Greg Marra created a memorial statue of Kyle for presentation to his widow. Fundraising for production of the statue was provided by members of the Tea Party movement.

In 2013, a Texas teacher, Dana Morris, attempted to get a section of Highway 75 through Dallas named after Chris Kyle, but was unsuccessful. In 2015, Morris made another attempt to get a road named after Chris Kyle and Chad Littlefield. During the 84th Texas Legislative Session, HB 1187 was introduced by Representative John Wray, (R) from Ellis County due to the efforts of Dana Morris' using grassroots effort to show her students that they did have a voice in their government. The bill was co-sponsored by 53 Republican congressional leaders. Littlefield's name was removed from the original bill due to his widow's wishes. The bill was changed to only reflect Chris Kyle's name. A twin bill HB 3 was put forth in the Senate by Senator Brian Birdwell in case HB 1187 did not pass through the Texas House vote. On May 20, 2015, HB 1187 passed both the House and Senate. The Chris Kyle Memorial Highway Bill was signed into law by Governor Greg Abbott on June 3, 2015, in Dallas, Texas. Abbott said to Morris, "this was a great project for students and will leave a fundamental legacy in their learning about government." The law became official September 1, 2015. On February 16, 2016, signs for the 11-mile stretch of Highway 287 through Midlothian, Texas, were unveiled. A subsequent bill was passed in 2018 to name a plaza and road after Chris Kyle in the town he was raised, Midlothian, Texas.

Clint Eastwood's film American Sniper (2014) is based on Kyle's autobiography. Kyle is portrayed by Bradley Cooper, and his wife Taya Kyle is portrayed by Sienna Miller. For his portrayal of Kyle, Cooper received an Academy Award nomination for Best Actor, and the film was nominated in five other categories, including Best Picture. The film won the Academy Award for Best Sound Editing.

On February 2, 2015, exactly two years after Kyle's murder, Texas Governor Greg Abbott declared the day "Chris Kyle Day".

A privately-funded memorial for Kyle, built in Odessa, Texas, was unveiled on July 28, 2016. It includes a plaza and a bronze statue.

Awards and decorations
The Navy revised Chris Kyle's list of awards on June 14, 2016.

Silver Star Citation

Citation:

See also
List of snipers
Longest recorded sniper kills

Bibliography
Kyle, Chris; McEwen, Scott; DeFelice, Jim (2013). American Sniper: The Autobiography of the Most Lethal Sniper in U.S. Military History. New York: W. Morrow, 2012.  
Kyle, Chris; Doyle, William (2013). American Gun: A History of the U.S. in Ten Firearms. New York: William Morrow, 2013.

References

Interviews

External links 

 

21st-century American non-fiction writers
1974 births
2013 deaths
American autobiographers
American male non-fiction writers
American military snipers
American military writers
United States Navy personnel of the Iraq War
Burials at Texas State Cemetery
Deaths by firearm in Texas
Male murder victims
Military personnel from Texas
Sniper warfare
Participants in American reality television series
American people of German descent
People from Ellis County, Texas
People from Odessa, Texas
People murdered in Texas
Recipients of the Silver Star
Recipients of the Texas Legislative Medal of Honor
Saddle bronc riders
United States Navy SEALs personnel
Writers from Texas
21st-century American male writers